Abraham W. Bolden (born January 19, 1935) is an American former United States Secret Service agent. He is the first African-American Secret Service agent assigned to the Presidential Protective Division, appointed by John F. Kennedy in 1961. Bolden was fired from the Secret Service after he was charged in 1964 with accepting a bribe in relation to a counterfeiting case he was involved with. Convicted by a jury, he was ultimately sentenced to six years in prison before being pardoned by President Joe Biden in April 2022.

Early life
Bolden was born January 19, 1935, to Daniel and Ophelia Bolden in East St. Louis, Illinois. He attended Lincoln High School in East St. Louis, Illinois. Bolden graduated cum laude from Lincoln University  with a B.A. in music composition. Afterwards, he became the first African-American detective with the Pinkerton National Detective Agency prior to becoming a highway patrolman with the Illinois State Police.

Bolden married Barbara L. Hardy in 1956 and the couple had three children, Ahvia Maria, Abraham Jr., and Daaim Shabazz.

Secret Service career
In October 1960, Bolden became a member of the United States Secret Service. In June 1961, he was transferred from Chicago and given a temporary assignment on the White House detail guarding President John F. Kennedy. With the assignment, part of the Secret Service practice of rotating newer agents onto the detail, Bolden became the first African American to guard the President. He was also reported to have "won two commendations for cracking counterfeiting rings". According to Jet magazine: "In 1962 he ranked second in the nation in solving" counterfeit and check forging cases.

According to Bolden, he was assigned to the Secret Service's Presidential Protective Division after he met Kennedy on April 28, 1961, while working an event at the McCormick Place in Chicago, and that Kennedy there personally invited him to join the White House detail as the first African-American assigned to protect the President. Bolden said that at one time Kennedy introduced him to others as "the Jackie Robinson of the Secret Service", a comment Bolden found so touching he almost broke into tears.

Bribery charges
On May 12, 1964, Bolden was accused of attempting to sell a government file to Joseph Spagnoli Jr. in exchange for $50,000. The file was evidence for a case in which Spagnoli was named as the head of a counterfeiting ring.

Bolden was arraigned in Chicago on May 20, 1964, on federal charges that he had solicited a bribe from the ring that he had helped break. He was accused of seeking $50,000 in exchange for a secret file on the investigation. A federal grand jury returned a three count indictment against Bolden charging him with "seeking a bribe in violation of his official duty" (18 U.S.C. § 201), "corruptly obstructing the due administration of justice" (18 U.S.C. § 1503), and "conspiring with Frank Jones to commit the crimes defined in these sections" (18 U.S.C. § 371).

Allegations: framed for attempting to reveal Secret Service misconduct
On May 20, Bolden held a news conference at his home on the South Side of Chicago and denied the charges. In addition, he asserted that he had been framed by the government because he planned to tell the Warren Commission about misconduct on the part of agents assigned to protect Kennedy. Bolden stated that two weeks earlier, prior to leaving for Washington to attend an in-service training, he told another agent that he planned to try to testify before the Commission. He told the media: "I wanted to and I still intend to, tell the commission about the laxity and non-chalant attitude of secret service agents handling the President." Bolden charged that agents drank heavily before and after tours of guarding Kennedy in Washington and at his summer home in Hyannis Port, Massachusetts, that they missed their work shifts or reported to their shifts "half drunk", and that they used official Secret Service cars to transport female companions or to visit bars. He said another agent called him a racial epithet when he complained about the issues. Bolden also stated that he told James J. Rowley, head of the Secret Service, about the drinking but that no action was taken.

Edward Hanrahan, United States Attorney for the Northern District of Illinois, issued a statement that described Bolden's allegations as "fantastic" and said: "The accuracy of these charges should be judged by the fact that the man who made them was silent from 1961 until after he was arrested..." Newspaper reports indicated that the Warren Commission was made aware of Bolden's allegations and quoted an unnamed member of the Commission as stating: "It would appear that he is trying to get off the hook by making such charges now. Nevertheless, the charges he makes are serious. He desires to testify and his request ought to be approved." According to the Associated Press, a spokesman for the Commission stated that they were considering calling Bolden, but had made no decision.

On June 18, Rowley addressed Bolden's allegations in testimony provided to the Warren Commission. Rowley explained that Bolden was selected to rotate through the White House detail for 30 days in the summer of 1961 as part of an orientation program, and that Bolden's allegations referred to a 5-day span in Hyannis Port. When J. Lee Rankin, general counsel for the Warren Commission, asked him when he received Bolden's complaint, Rowley replied: "The fact is he never informed me. He never informed any of his supervisors or anyone on the detail." Rankin then interrupted his questioning of Rowley to state: "I think the record should show, Mr. Chairman, that we were never advised that he wanted to testify, nor had we any inquiry or anything about the matter, until after we learned about it in the newspapers. And, even then, he didn't ask to testify. And we asked the FBI to check into it, and he had counsel and they refused to tell anything about the matter at that time." Rowley later stated that there was "no truth to the charges of misconduct". He added that Bolden had leveled eleven charges and that there was partial truth to one of the charges (that the agents had purchased two or three cases of beer which were available to agents coming off duty), but that his investigation found that there were no violations of Secret Service regulations. In response to Rankin's questioning, Rowley answered that Bolden's indictment was the first time he could recall that a criminal complaint was lodged against a Secret Service agent.

Trials
Bolden performed a series of piano recitals throughout Chicago in order to raise money for his legal defense fund.

The government's case included the testimony of two men, Frank Jones and Joseph Spagnoli, both facing felony charges originating from the same Secret Service office that Bolden was employed and who were facing upcoming trials before the same Chicago court. The cases against Jones and ten of his co-conspirators were dismissed after Bolden's conviction. The copy of the secret government file on the Spagnoli counterfeiting operation that Bolden allegedly put up for sale was never recovered, last being seen in the Chicago offices of the Secret Service, disappearing before charges were brought against Bolden. Bolden was not accused of receiving any illicit funds from the accused felons who testified against him.

On July 6, 1964, Bolden's trial opened in the United States District Court for the Northern District of Illinois. Secret Service agent Maurice G. Martineau, the first witness for the prosecution, testified that Spagnoli complained to him in a telephone call that the government was attempting to entrap him. According to Martineau, Spagnoli said he was visited by a stranger who said a Secret Service agent offered to sell him information for $50,000. He said his investigation led him to Frank W. Jones who told him Bolden had sent him to Spagnoli. Martineau testified that he confronted Bolden with the allegations of Spagnoli and Jones, and that Bolden denied them.

The following day on July 7, the prosecution's chief witness, Jones, testified that Bolden attempted to sell him government information for $50,000. He said that Bolden had driven him to a park where he showed him parts of a Secret Service file. During his testimony on July 9, Bolden denied all charges against him. He also denied that he had offered Richard Walter, an informant, $500 to kill Jones and said that he had only told Walter to stay away from Jones. Bolden's first jury deadlocked 11-1 in favor of conviction, at which time presiding judge Joseph Sam Perry issued an Allen charge in which he expressed his belief that Bolden was guilty but that the jury was free to disregard his opinion. The jury remained deadlocked, and Perry declared a mistrial on July 11, 1964. He set August 3 as the date for a new trial.

Bolden was re-tried. On August 12, 1964, the jury found Bolden guilty of the charges and Judge Perry sentenced him to six years in prison. Perry had the option to sentence him to 25 years and $165,000 ($15,000 plus three times the amount of the bribe). Bolden was reported to have responded tearfully to the verdict: "If at the time of my arrest I ever embarrassed any agency of the United States, it was because at the time I thought my statements were true. I did not mean to embarrass anybody. I ask you, please have mercy. In God's name, please have mercy!" Acknowledging Bolden's apology, Hanrahan told the media: "The verdict completely rejects the outrageous charges made by the defendant and confirms the public's belief in the absolute integrity of the U.S. Secret Service."

Bolden was fired by the Service in August 1964. While his appeal was pending, Bolden was employed in Chicago by the Ingersoll Products Division of the Borg-Warner Corporation as an assembly line inspector of government ordered helmets and canteens. At Ingersoll, he was credited with starting a collection among fellow employees that raised enough money to send 75,000 cigarettes to American military forces in South Vietnam. During that time, he was also an official for Local 333 of the United Automobile Workers.

Appeal and pardon
In January 1965, five months after Bolden's trial and sentencing, Spagnoli was found guilty on counterfeiting charges and sentenced to fifteen years. At his trial, Spagnoli said his livelihood was gambling, that he had falsely testified in Bolden's trial that his mother supported him, and that this false testimony was suborned by the government counsel in order to improve the jury's opinion of him. He said that he lied about the date of his first contact with Agent Martineau and may have lied about other dates. On the basis of this information, Bolden appealed his conviction as well as the denial of a motion for a retrial to the United States Court of Appeals for the Seventh Circuit. In addition, he claimed that Perry's Allen charge in the first trial was evidence that Perry was not impartial and that his failure to recuse himself denied Bolden a fair trial.

In a decision issued December 29, 1965, Judges John Simpson Hastings, Winfred George Knoch, and Luther Merritt Swygert for the Seventh Circuit Court upheld Bolden's conviction and denied a retrial. The Court wrote that they found no merit to his claim that he had not received an impartial trial under Perry, and that his opinion to the deliberating jurors as to what the evidence showed could not be equated with personal bias. Regarding Spagnoli's testimony at Bolden's trial, the Court said his testimony was "merely cumulative" and rejected Bolden's "central contention" that Spagnoli was an essential witness for the prosecution whose testimony could only be corroborated by the testimony of Jones. Addressing the issue of perjury that was at the core of Bolden's appeal, the Seventh Circuit Court noted what Spagnoli had testified at both trials and said he had not actually perjured himself about his source of income. The Court noted that Spagnoli's "livelihood was clearly a collateral matter bearing upon his credibility" and that they did not believe "the jury's overall appraisal of this witness would have been substantially affected by the knowledge that he was being less than forthright concerning his source of income."

Bolden was ordered to begin serving his sentence in June 1966. He served thirty-nine months in prison and was released on two and a half years' probation.

On April 26, 2022 it was announced that Bolden had been pardoned by President Joe Biden as part of "Second Chance Month".

Allegations of a "Chicago plot" to assassinate John F. Kennedy

Early reports
On December 5, 1967, while Bolden was serving his sentence at the United States Medical Center for Federal Prisoners in Springfield, Missouri, attorneys John Hosmer (Bolden's lawyer), Mark Lane (author of Rush to Judgment), and Richard V. Burnes (assistant to Jim Garrison) held a news conference in which they stated they had received information from Bolden that the Secret Service was aware of a prior assassination attempt on Kennedy in Chicago. According to the attorneys, the Secret Service had been informed that an attempt on the President's life would be made in Chicago which resulted in the cancellation of his visit due to safety concerns. They stated that Bolden said he and other agents had shadowed a suspect due to the report.

On March 21, 1970, Sherman Skolnick appeared on an FM radio program with Ted Weber of WTMX and stated that Bolden was falsely imprisoned to prevent him from revealing that there was a plot to kill Kennedy in Chicago. The Chicago Sun-Times reported that they attempted to contact Bolden regarding the allegations, but that he refused to comment.

The following month on April 6, Skolnick filed suit with the United States district court in Chicago against the National Archives and Records Service stating that the agency had illegally suppressed documents that pointed to what he claimed was a plot to assassinate Kennedy at the Army—Air Force game there on November 2, 1963. The suit stated that the assassination attempt was rescheduled for three weeks later in Dallas. Skolnick said that the Warren Commission forwarded materials to the Archives that connected Vallee to Oswald by way of the rifle and a 1962 Ford Falcon. In response, the United States Department of Justice was reported to have "no comment" and National Archivist Marion Johnson said he had seen nothing in the Archives that connected Vallee to an assassination attempt. Time magazine reported that "a former Secret Service agent" was among those "people with information about the alleged plot" who sought out Skolnick. Skolnick later told Kenn Thomas of Steamshovel Press that a "mysterious courier" gave him a "pile of documents about the Chicago plot against Kennedy" that had been compiled by Bolden. In that interview, Skolnick claimed that the "secret documents" had been stolen from the National Archives.

In 1975, the allegation of a "Chicago plot" was reiterated by Edwin Black in an issue of Chicago Independent. Black was reported to have drawn upon Skolnick's research and firsthand information provided by Bolden.

House Select Committee on Assassinations
Established in 1976 to investigate the assassinations of Kennedy and Martin Luther King Jr., the United States House of Representatives Select Committee on Assassinations (HSCA) stated that part of its responsibilities was to evaluate the performances of the CIA, FBI, and Secret Service. The HSCA's final report included the finding that the "Secret Service was deficient in the performance of its duties" as it "possessed information that was not properly analyzed, investigated or used by the Secret Service in connection with the President's trip to Dallas". It said that Secret Service offices in Chicago and Miami failed to relay to the Dallas region two separate threats by individuals, the first by Vallee and the second by Joseph A. Milteer, to assassinate Kennedy with high-powered rifles in early November 1963.

During its investigation, Bolden provided testimony to the HSCA in January 1978. Allegations he made to the Committee were discussed in its final report:

In addition [to the threat by Thomas Arthur Vallee], the committee obtained the testimony of a former Secret Service agent, Abraham Bolden, who had been assigned to the Chicago office in 1963. He alleged that shortly before November 2, the FBI sent a teletype message to the Chicago Secret Service office stating that an attempt to assassinate the President would be made on November 2 by a four-man team using high-powered rifles, and that at least one member of the team had a Spanish-sounding name. Bolden claimed that while he did not personally participate in surveillance of the subjects, he learned about a surveillance of the four by monitoring Secret Service radio channels in his automobile and by observing one of the subjects being detained in his Chicago office.

According to Bolden's account, the Secret Service succeeded in locating and surveillance two of the threat subjects who, when they discovered they were being watched, were arrested and detained on the evening of November 1 in the Chicago Secret Service office.

The committee was unable to document the existence of the alleged assassination team. Specifically, no agent who had been assigned to Chicago confirmed any aspect of Bolden's version. One agent did state there had been a threat in Chicago during that period, but he was unable to recall details. Bolden did not link Vallee to the supposed four-man assassination team, although he claimed to remember Vallee's name in connection with a 1963 Chicago case. He did not recognize Vallee's photograph when shown it by the committee.

The questionable authenticity of the Bolden account notwithstanding, the committee believed the Secret Service failed to make appropriate use of the information supplied it by the Chicago threat in early November 1963.

Later reports
Bolden was interviewed for Lamar Waldron and Thom Hartmann's 2005 book Ultimate Sacrifice: John and Robert Kennedy, the Plan for a Coup in Cuba, and the Murder of JFK and details of his account appear throughout the book. In 2006, he was interviewed for the television documentary Conspiracy Files: The JFK Assassination based on information in Ultimate Sacrifice. The program asserted that mobster John Roselli was responsible for framing Bolden. James W. Douglass interviewed Bolden seven times between 1998 and 2004, and devoted an entire chapter to the alleged plot in his 2008 book JFK and the Unspeakable. Douglass stated that the Secret Service "deliberately destroyed" documents related to the plot in January 1995 after they were requested by the Assassination Records Review Board.

In 2007, Bolden reiterated his allegations to Chuck Goudie of ABC News Chicago affiliate WLS-TV; ABC News ran the headline describing his claims as a "New Assassination Plot".

Bolden was interviewed about the Chicago JFK assassination plot in Episode 5 of the History Channel series Breaking Mysterious, which first aired in 2017.

Later career
Following his release from prison, Bolden worked as a quality control supervisor in the automotive industry until his retirement in 2001. His wife, Barbara, died in 2005.

The Echo From Dealey Plaza
In 2008, Bolden published his memoir, The Echo From Dealey Plaza. Interviewed about the book by NPR's Farai Chideya, Bolden stated that he believed that there was a conspiracy to assassinate Kennedy and that he heard agents displeased with the President's integration policies state that they would not attempt to protect him in an assassination attempt. Reviewing the memoir for The Washington Post, critic Bruce Watson called it "a shocking story of injustice," sometimes marred by "plodding prose and drab dialogue."

Portrayals in fiction
Abraham Bolden appears in the 2011 television miniseries The Kennedys, portrayed by Rothaford Gray. He is depicted joining the President's protective detail; later President Kennedy turns to him as a sounding board during the crisis surrounding the 1962 desegregation of the University of Mississippi.

The character Eben Boldt in "Target Lancer", a crime fiction novel by Max Allen Collins, is based on Abraham Boldens' role in a failed assassination attempt on John F. Kennedy in Chicago, November 1963. Collins acknowledges this basis on Bolden in a postscript to the novel.

Further reading
 Bolden, Abraham (2008). The Echo From Dealey Plaza: The True Story of the First African American on the White House Secret Service Detail and His Quest for Justice After the Assassination of JFK. Random House Digital, Inc. .
 Palamara, Vincent (2013). "Survivor's Guilt: The Secret Service and the Failure to Protect President Kennedy". Trine Day. .

References

External links
The Echo From Dealey Plaza by Abraham Bolden

1935 births
Living people
African-American non-fiction writers
African-American police officers
American memoirists
American non-fiction writers
American state police officers
American people convicted of bribery
Lincoln University (Missouri) alumni
People from East St. Louis, Illinois
Recipients of American presidential pardons
Researchers of the assassination of John F. Kennedy
United States Secret Service agents
Writers from Illinois